Michał Bogusław Bąkiewicz (born 22 March 1981) is a Polish professional volleyball coach and former player. He was a member of the Poland national team from 2001 to 2011. A participant in the Olympic Games Athens 2004, silver medallist at the 2006 World Championship, and the 2009 European Champion.

Career

Clubs
In 2013, after six seasons spent in PGE Skra Bełchatów, he moved to AZS Częstochowa. In early December 2014, he decided to end his career and officially joined the coaching staff of AZS Częstochowa.

National team
Bąkiewicz was a member of the Polish national volleyball team that won a silver medal at the 2006 World Championship. In 2009, he won a title of the European Champion. On 14 September 2009, he was awarded the Knight's Cross of Polonia Restituta. The Order was conferred on the following day by the Prime Minister of Poland of that time, Donald Tusk.

Honours

As a player
 CEV Champions League
  2011/2012 – with PGE Skra Bełchatów
 FIVB Club World Championship
  Doha 2009 – with PGE Skra Bełchatów
  Doha 2010 – with PGE Skra Bełchatów
 National championships
 2007/2008  Polish Championship, with PGE Skra Bełchatów
 2008/2009  Polish Cup, with PGE Skra Bełchatów
 2008/2009  Polish Championship, with PGE Skra Bełchatów
 2009/2010  Polish Championship, with PGE Skra Bełchatów
 2010/2011  Polish Cup, with PGE Skra Bełchatów
 2010/2011  Polish Championship, with PGE Skra Bełchatów
 2011/2012  Polish SuperCup, with PGE Skra Bełchatów
 2011/2012  Polish Cup, with PGE Skra Bełchatów

As a coach
 2021  FIVB U19 World Championship, with Poland U19

State awards
 2006:  Gold Cross of Merit
 2009:  Knight's Cross of Polonia Restituta

References

External links

 
 
 
 Player profile at PlusLiga.pl 
 
 Coach/Player profile at Volleybox.net

1981 births
Living people
Sportspeople from Piotrków Trybunalski
Polish men's volleyball players
Polish volleyball coaches
Polish Champions of men's volleyball
Olympic volleyball players of Poland
Volleyball players at the 2004 Summer Olympics
Recipients of the Gold Cross of Merit (Poland)
Knights of the Order of Polonia Restituta
AZS Częstochowa players
Skra Bełchatów players
AZS Olsztyn players
AZS Częstochowa coaches
Outside hitters